Wimbledon Chase railway station is in the London Borough of Merton in South London. The station is served by Thameslink trains on the Sutton Loop Line. It is in Travelcard Zone 3 and is arranged as an island eight-car platform, with stairs descending to street level towards the southern end.

History
Parliamentary approval for a line from Wimbledon to Sutton had been obtained by the Wimbledon and Sutton Railway (W&SR) in 1910 but work had been delayed by World War I. From the W&SR's inception, the District Railway (DR) was a shareholder of the company and had rights to run trains over the line when built. In the 1920s, the London Electric Railway (LER, precursor of London Underground) planned, through its ownership of the DR, to use part of the route for an extension of the City and South London Railway (C&SLR, now the Northern line) to Sutton. The SR objected and an agreement was reached that enabled the C&SLR to extend as far as Morden in exchange for the LER giving up its rights over the W&SR route. The SR subsequently built the line, one of the last to be built in the London area.

Wimbledon Chase station was not included in the original 1910 permission, stations at Elm Grove to the north and Cannon Hill to the south were planned, but were not constructed. The station opened on 7 July 1929 when the first section of the line to South Merton came into operation. The route opened to Sutton on 5 January 1930.

Services
All services at Wimbledon Chase are operated by Thameslink using  EMUs.

The typical off-peak service in trains per hour is:
 2 tph to 
 2 tph to 

Connections
London Buses routes 152, 163, 164, K5 and 655 serve the station.

References

Bibliography

External links

Railway stations in the London Borough of Merton
Former Southern Railway (UK) stations
Railway stations in Great Britain opened in 1929
Railway stations served by Govia Thameslink Railway
Buildings and structures in Wimbledon, London
Proposed London Underground stations
James Robb Scott buildings